Antoniy Balakov (Bulgarian: Антоний Балъков; born 14 December 1988) is a Bulgarian footballer who plays as a midfielder. He is a nephew of former footballer Krasimir Balakov.

Career
On 20 January 2017, Balakov joined Litex Lovech. He helped the team to achieve promotion to Second League but was released in June. In July 2017, he returned to Lokomotiv Gorna Oryahovitsa.  He left the club at the end of the 2017–18 season.

References

External links

Profile at Sportal.bg

1988 births
Living people
People from Veliko Tarnovo
Bulgarian footballers
First Professional Football League (Bulgaria) players
Second Professional Football League (Bulgaria) players
FC Etar 1924 Veliko Tarnovo players
FC Pomorie players
FC Lokomotiv Gorna Oryahovitsa players
PFC Litex Lovech players
Association football midfielders
Sportspeople from Veliko Tarnovo Province